Stemona tuberosa is a species of flowering plant in the family Stemonaceae. It is native to China, India, southeast Asia, and New Guinea. Hornets play an important role in seed dispersal by biting off the seed with its elaiosome and then carrying the seed away for about 100 m. There they chew off the elaiosome and abandon the seed which is likely to be taken by ants into their nest.

Traditional medicine
Stemona tuberosa is one of the 50 fundamental herbs used in traditional Chinese medicine.  It can be used as a treatment for Pediculus capitus and Phthirus pubis typically with low skin irritation.

Varieties
accepted varieties
 Stemona tuberosa var. minor (Hook.f.) C.E.C.Fisch. - India
 Stemona tuberosa var. moluccana (Blume) ined. - New Guinea, Maluku, Philippines, Lesser Sunda Islands
 Stemona tuberosa var. tuberosa - China, India, Bangladesh, Indochina, Maluku, Philippines, Lesser Sunda Islands

See also
Chinese herbology 50 fundamental herbs

References

Plants described in 1790
Flora of Asia
Flora of New Guinea
Stemonaceae
Plants used in traditional Chinese medicine